Thomas, Tommy or Tom Butler may refer to:

Nobility and politics
 Thomas Butler (MP for Gloucestershire) (1358–1398), in 1397 MP for Gloucestershire
 Thomas Butler (16th-century MP) (1513–1579) for Lancashire
 Thomas Butler (Louisiana politician) (1785–1847), congressman from Louisiana
 Thomas B. Butler (1806–1873), Chief Justice of the Connecticut Supreme Court, and U.S. congressman from Connecticut
 Thomas S. Butler (1855–1928), U.S. congressman from Pennsylvania, father of Marine Corps General Smedley Butler
 Thomas Butler, 7th Earl of Ormond (c. 1426–1515), Irish nobleman
 Thomas Butler, 10th Earl of Ormond (c. 1531–1614), Lord Treasurer of Ireland
 Thomas Butler, 6th Earl of Ossory (1634–1680), Lord Deputy of Ireland
 Sir Thomas Butler, 3rd Baronet (died 1704), Irish MP for County Carlow 1692–1704
 Thomas Butler, 6th Viscount Ikerrin (1683–1719), Irish nobleman
 Sir Thomas Butler, 6th Baronet (1735–1772), Irish MP for County Carlow 1761–1768, and Portarlington
 Tom Butler (Alabama politician) (born 1944), American politician in the Alabama Senate
 Thomas Butler, 1st Baron Cahir (died 1558), Irish peer
 Thomas Butler, 2nd Baron Cahir (before 1568–1626/7)
 Thomas Butler, 3rd Baron Cahir
 Thomas Butler, Viscount Thurles (died 1619)
 Thomas Butler, 1st Baron Dunboyne (1271–1329)
 Thomas Butler (Australian politician) (1875–1937), member of the Tasmanian Parliament
 Thomas H. Butler (1819–1889), American politician, soldier, attorney, and engineer
 Tom Butler (Australian politician) (1929–2006), member of the Western Australian parliament
 Tom Butler (Oregon politician) (born 1946), former Oregon State Represrntative

Sports
 Thomas Butler (athlete) (1871–1928), British tug of war competitor
 Thomas Butler (footballer) (born 1981), Irish footballer
 Thomas Butler (bobsleigh), American bobsledder
 Tom Butler (cyclist) (1878–?), Canadian-born cyclist who represented USA
 Tom Butler (footballer) (died 1923), English football player
 Tom Butler (hurler) (1902–1984), Irish hurler
 Thomas Butler (Paralympic swimmer) (1913–1963), Australian Paralympic swimmer 
 Tommy Butler (hurler) (born 1951), Irish retired hurler
 Tommy Butler (footballer) (1918–2009), retired English professional footballer

Other
 Thomas Butler (judge) (died after 1496), Irish judge who held the office of Irish Master of the Rolls
 Thomas Butler (soldier) (1748–1805), Continental Army officer during the American Revolution
 Thomas Adair Butler (1836–1901), English recipient of the Victoria Cross
 Thomas Ambrose Butler (1837–1897), Irish-American priest and author
 Thomas C. Butler, American scientist of infectious diseases
 Thomas Harrison Butler (1871–1945), British ophthalmologist and amateur boat designer
 Thomas Dacres Butler (1845–1937), British Army officer and civil servant
 Thomas O'Brien Butler (1861–1915), Irish composer
 Tom Butler (bishop) (born 1940), Bishop of Southwark, England
 Tom Butler (actor) (born 1951), Canadian actor
 Tommy Butler (1915–1970), detective who investigated the 1963 Great Train Robbery

See also
 Butler baronets